St George's is a former church in Great George Street, off Park Street, on the lower slopes of Brandon Hill in Bristol, England.  Since 1999 it has been used as a music venue known as St George's Bristol.  It was built in the 1820s by Sir Robert Smirke. It is a Grade II* listed building.

History
St George's was built for use as a church in the Clifton area of Bristol, England, between 1821 and 1823 by the architect Sir Robert Smirke, who designed it in the Greek Revival style. It was a "Waterloo church", the only one in Bristol to receive government money from the first grant under the Church Building Act of 1818.

It has been designated as a grade II* listed building.

In 1999, the church underwent extensive renovations to make it suitable for use as a full-time concert venue and it re-opened that October under the name by which it is now known, St George's Bristol.

Archives
Parish records for St George's church, Brandon Hill, Bristol are held at Bristol Archives (Ref. P.St GB) (online catalogue) including baptism and marriage registers and one burial register. The archive also includes records of the incumbent, churchwardens, parochial church council and charities, plus plans and photographs.

Concert venue
In 1976 St George's Music Trust was formed and in succeeding years they established the church as a major concert venue, initially known as St George's, Brandon Hill.  The main body of the church seats 562 people and the crypt has been transformed into a bar and recording studios which are regularly used by the BBC.

The 1999 renovations were extensive. They included replacing the auditorium pews with padded chairs, making the pews in the gallery more comfortable for concert seating, creating a box office and removing the font which was donated to the Church of St Mary on the Quay.

St George's Bristol is particularly known for presenting classical, jazz, folk, world music and opera and stages more than 200 events every year, regularly attracting artists of international note including Angela Hewitt, Nicola Benedetti, Mark Padmore, plus The Orchestra of the Age of Enlightenment (in Spring/Summer of 2010) and Viktoria Mullova, Stephen Hough, Paul Lewis, Christian Blackshaw, Janis Ian, Abdullah Ibrahim and Marc Almond (in Autumn 2011). In addition, regular performances are given by local professional groups such as the Bristol Ensemble and amateur orchestras and choirs.

See also
 Churches in Bristol
 Grade II* listed buildings in Bristol

References

External links

 St George's Bristol official website

Former churches in Bristol
Former Church of England church buildings
Church of England church buildings in Bristol
Churches completed in 1823
19th-century Church of England church buildings
Brandon Hill
Brandon Hill
Music venues in Bristol
Concert halls in England